Ophichthus shaoi, the long-bodied snake eel, is an eel in the family Ophichthidae (worm/snake eels). It is found around Taiwan.

Etymology
The fish is named in honor of ichthyologist and marine ecologist Kwang-Tsao Shao (b. 1951) of the Biodiversity Research Center, Academia Sinica, Taiwan.

References

shaoi
Fish of Taiwan
Taxa named by John E. McCosker
Taxa named by Hans Hsuan-Ching Ho
Fish described in 2015